The 1997 World Series of Poker (WSOP) was a series of poker tournaments held at Binion's Horseshoe. Most notably, it was the only WSOP where the Main Event final table took place outdoors, at the Fremont Street Experience, just outside Binions.

Preliminary events

Main Event

There were 312 entrants to the main event. Each entrant paid $10,000 to enter the tournament. Stu Ungar won the Main Event for a record-tying third time.

Final table

*Career statistics prior to the beginning of the 1997 Main Event.

Final table results

Other High Finishes

NB: This list is restricted to top 30 finishers with an existing Wikipedia entry.

External links
1997 World Series of Poker at Conjelco.com

World Series of Poker
World Series of Poker